This is a complete list of all Sri Lankan parliaments since 1931, including their beginnings, endings, and dates of sessions.

List of parliaments

See also
 Parliament of Sri Lanka
 Cabinet of Sri Lanka

References

External links
 Durations of Parliament
 Sessions of Parliament

List
Parliaments